The Loening M-8 was a 1910s American fighter monoplane designed by Grover Loening and built by his Loening Aeronautical Engineering Company. An order of 5000 for the United States Army Air Corps was canceled when the First World War ended.

Development
The first design by Grover Loening after he had formed his company was a two-seat braced-wing monoplane fighter the M-8. It had a fixed tail-skid landing gear and was powered by a nose-mounted Hispano-Suiza engine with a tractor propeller. The pilot and gunner had tandem open cockpits. The first aircraft was flown in 1918 and after testing, the United States Army Air Corps ordered 5,000 aircraft to be built. 

Only two aircraft were delivered to the Army and one to the United States Navy, with the designation M-8-0. At the end of the war the order was canceled. The Navy ordered 46 aircraft in two variants for use as observation aircraft. The Navy also ordered six M-8-S twin-float seaplane versions. A single-seat version was developed for the Army as the Loening PW-2.

Variants
M-8
Production variant for the United States Army Air Corps, two prototypes, 5000 cancelled.
M-8-0
One M-8 for evaluation by the United States Navy (A5631) and ten production aircraft (A5637-A5646).
M-8-1
Second production variant for the United States Navy, 36 built by the Naval Aircraft Factory (A5701-A571O; A5761-A5786).
M-8-1S
Seaplane variant for the United States Navy, six built (A5788-A5793).
LS
(LS - Loening Seaplane) Three seaplane variants ordered to test the Richardson pontoon split central float. One aircraft built, (A5606), and two cancelled.

Operators

United States Army Air Corps
United States Navy

Specifications (M-8-0)

See also

References

Notes

Bibliography

 

1910s United States fighter aircraft
M-8
Aircraft first flown in 1918